Senecio infirmus is a species of plant from South Africa.

Description 
This perennial subshrub has narrow, hairless leaves. Yellow flowerheads are borne on long filiform stalks. Each has 10-12 rays and 18-20 bracts. The fruits are achenes (dry fruits containing a single seed). They are hairy.

Distribution 
This plant grows in the Western Cape and Eastern Cape of South Africa.

Conservation 
There is currently insufficient evidence to assess this species risk of extinction.

References 

Plants described in 1992
Flora of South Africa
infirmus